The Scarlet Button is a 1944 mystery thriller novel by Anthony Gilbert, the pen name of British writer Lucy Beatrice Malleson. It is the fourteenth in her series featuring the London solicitor Arthur Crook, one of the more unscrupulous detectives of the Golden Age. It was published in the United States, initially under the same name and later with the alternative title Murder is Cheap.

Synopsis
James Chigwell a prolific blackmailer is discovered bludgeoned to death. The murderer may be any one of his large number of victims.

References

Bibliography
 Magill, Frank Northen . Critical Survey of Mystery and Detective Fiction: Authors, Volume 2. Salem Press, 1988.
Murphy, Bruce F. The Encyclopedia of Murder and Mystery. Springer, 1999.
 Reilly, John M. Twentieth Century Crime & Mystery Writers. Springer, 2015.

1944 British novels
British mystery novels
British thriller novels
Novels by Anthony Gilbert
Novels set in England
British detective novels
Collins Crime Club books